Of Fungi and Foe is the second solo album by Les Claypool. The album was released on the March 17, 2009. The album featured  Eugene Hütz, Paulo Baldi, Mike Dillon, Lapland Miclovik, Sam Bass, Cage Claypool, and Bryonn Bain.

Claypool stated:

All Lyrics Written by Les Claypool

Track listing
"Mushroom Men" – 3:15
"Amanitas" – 4:27
"Red State Girl" – 3:05
"Booneville Stomp" – 4:57
"What Would Sir George Martin Do" – 5:50
"You Can't Tell Errol Anything" – 3:55
"Bite Out of Life" – 4:34
"Kazoo" – 4:12
"Primed by 29" – 3:26
"Pretty Little Song" – 4:09
"Of Fungi and Foe" – 1:52
"Ol' Rosco" – 5:58

Personnel
 Les Claypool – bass guitars, percussion, penny whistle, "uber-dogs of doom", vocals
 Mike Dillon – tabla (3), marimba solo (5), vibraphone (6, 8)
 Sam Bass – cello (8, 10, 12)
 Paulo Baldi – drums (7)
 Eugene Hütz - vocals (7), acoustic guitar (7)
 Cage Claypool – slide whistle (5)
 Bryonn Bain – additional lyric/vocal (10)

Production
 Produced & engineered by Les Claypool.
 All songs written by Claypool, Long Corn Publishing (BMI) except "Bite Out of Life" written by Claypool [Long Corn Publishing (BMI)] & Hütz [Hütz Muson (ASCAP)].
 Recorded at Rancho Relaxo, Studio Assistant: Derek "D Duck" Walls.
 Mastered by Stephen Marcussen for Marcussen Mastering, Hollywood, California.
 Cover paintings: Travis Louie.
 Design & layout: Zoltron.
 Live photos: Ross Pelton.
 Project supervisor: Leanne Lajoie.
 Management: Andy Gould & Leanne Lajoie for Spectacle Group

References

External links
Lesclay.com

2009 albums
Prawn Song Records albums
Les Claypool albums